Bruno Sido (born 19 February 1951) is a member of the Senate of France, representing the Haute-Marne department.  He is a member of The Republicans.

Ahead of the 2022 presidential elections, Sido publicly declared his support for Michel Barnier as the Republicans’ candidate.

References

Page on the Senate website

1951 births
Living people
Politicians from Paris
The Republicans (France) politicians
Rally for the Republic politicians
Union for a Popular Movement politicians
Gaullism, a way forward for France
French Senators of the Fifth Republic
Senators of Haute-Marne